Lone Mountain may refer to a place in the United States:

 Lone Mountain, Tennessee, an unincorporated community
 Lone Mountain (California), a hill in San Francisco, California
 Lone Mountain, San Francisco, California, the associated neighborhood
 Lone Mountain (Montana), a mountain in the Madison Range
 Lone Mountain, Nevada, a ghost town
 Lone Mountain (Elko County, Nevada)
 Lone Mountain (Eureka County, Nevada)
 Lone Mountain (New York), a mountain in Ulster County 
 Lone Mountain State Forest, a mountain and state forest in Morgan County, Tennessee